The 2008 All Thailand Golf Tour was the 10th season of the All Thailand Golf Tour, the main professional golf tour in Thailand since it was established in 1999.

Schedule
The following tables list official events during the 2008 season.

Men's events

Women's events

Notes

References

All Thailand Golf Tour
All Thailand Golf Tour